Jan Drapała (17 June 1899 – 1 September 1945) was a Polish footballer. He played in one match for the Poland national football team in 1926.

References

External links
 

1899 births
1945 deaths
Polish footballers
Poland international footballers
Place of birth missing
Association football goalkeepers